Nassarius clathratus, common name the clathrate nassa, is a species of sea snail, a marine gastropod mollusc in the family Nassariidae, the Nassa mud snails or dog whelks.

Description

Distribution
This species occurs in the Red Sea and in the Mediterranean Sea.

References

 Cernohorsky W. O. (1984). Systematics of the family Nassariidae (Mollusca: Gastropoda). Bulletin of the Auckland Institute and Museum 14: 1–356. 
 Rolán E. & Hernández J.M. (2005) The West African species of the group Nassarius denticulatus (Mollusca, Neogastropoda), with the description of a new species. Journal of Conchology 38(5): 499–511. page(s): 506

External links

Nassariidae